Bhalchnadra Panchwadkar, is a Marathi singer and music director.

Personal life 
Panchwadkar has two children. His son Girish Panchwadkar is a Marathi singer.

References 

Indian male singers
Marathi people
Singers from Maharashtra
Marathi-language singers
Marathi music
Hindustani singers
Living people
Year of birth missing (living people)